Corpses Are Forever is a 2003 American horror spy film written and directed by Jose Prendes. It stars Prendes as an amnesiac spy who must recover his memories and uncover the origins of a zombie apocalypse. Alongside Prendes, the film's cast includes Richard Lynch, Brinke Stevens, Bill Perlach, Debbie Rochon, Linnea Quigley, and Don Calfa.

Plot 
During a zombie apocalypse, Malcolm Grant, a CIA agent, allows himself to be experimented on by a government lab run by General Morton.  Morton believes the only way to stop the apocalypse is by wiping Grant's memories and injecting Grant with the experiences of Quint Barrow, the index case of the zombie plague.  Through Grant's flashbacks as Barrow, they learn that the apocalypse was begun through a deal with Satan.  Grant teams up with a priest, his ex-wife, and a nurse to stop doomsday.

Cast 
 Jose Prendes as Malcolm Grant / Quint Barrow
 Richard Lynch as General Morton
 Brinke Stevens as Dr. Emily Thesinger
 Bill Perlach as Father James Mason
 Debbie Rochon as Maguerite
 Linnea Quigley as Elli Kroger
 Don Calfa as Jack Stark

Production 
Corpses Are Forever was shot in Miami, Florida.

Release 
Prendes received a voicemail message from Lionsgate offering a distribution deal, but they unexpectedly pulled out.  It was later released by The Asylum, with whom he developed a relationship.

Reception 
Bill Beyrer of Cinema Blend rated it 3.5/5 stars and wrote that he initially intended to write a sarcastic negative review, but the film turned out to be better than expected.  Mike Watt of Film Threat rated it 3/5 stars and wrote, "It's a gutsy movie; it just doesn't work."  In The Zombie Movie Encyclopedia, Volume 2, Peter Dendle wrote that the film is "unburdened by any sort of budget or clarity of vision".

References

External links 
 

2003 films
2003 horror films
2003 independent films
2000s spy films
2000s thriller films
American psychological horror films
American spy films
American independent films
Apocalyptic films
Religious horror films
American zombie films
Films shot in Miami
The Asylum films
Films about the Central Intelligence Agency
2000s English-language films
2000s American films